Marcela is a Mexican telenovela produced by Televisa for Telesistema Mexicano in 1962.

Cast 
 Bárbara Gil		
 Aldo Monti			
 Aurora Walker	
 Felipe del Castillo		
 Josefina Leiner	
 Julio Monterde		
 Miguel Manzano	
 Blanca Sánchez

References

External links 

Mexican telenovelas
1962 telenovelas
Televisa telenovelas
1962 Mexican television series debuts
1962 Mexican television series endings
Spanish-language telenovelas